These are the official results of the Women's 400 metres event at the 1999 IAAF World Championships in Seville, Spain. There were a total number of 52 participating athletes, with seven qualifying heats, four quarter-finals, two semi-finals and the final held on Thursday 26 August 1999 at 20:30h.

Final

Semi-final
Held on Tuesday 24 August 1999

Quarter-finals
Held on Monday 23 August 1999

Heats
Held on Tuesday 24 August 1999

References
 

H
400 metres at the World Athletics Championships
1999 in women's athletics